René Pénicaud (18 June 1843 — 23 November 1899) was a French politician and lawyer.

He was served as mayors of Limoges from 1876 to 1881. He was a deputy for Haute-Vienne from 1880 to 1885. He regained a senator's seat in 1886.

Biography
René Pénicaud was born in Limoges, France on 1843 and died in Aureil, France on 1899 at the age of 56. He remained in office until his death.

References 

1853 births
1899 deaths
People from Limoges
French republicans
Members of the 2nd Chamber of Deputies of the French Third Republic
Members of the 3rd Chamber of Deputies of the French Third Republic
19th-century French lawyers